Protein kinase, X-linked is a protein that in humans is encoded by the PRKX gene.

Function

This gene encodes a serine threonine protein kinase that has similarity to the catalytic subunit of cyclic AMP dependent protein kinases. The encoded protein is developmentally regulated and may be involved in renal epithelial morphogenesis. This protein may also be involved in macrophage and granulocyte maturation. Abnormal recombination between this gene and a related pseudogene on chromosome Y is a frequent cause of sex reversal disorder in XX males and XY females. Pseudogenes of this gene are found on chromosomes X, 15 and Y.

Nomenclature
Mouse ortholog for this gene, Prkx, is also known as Pkare.

References

Further reading